Netherlands competed at the 1988 Summer Paralympics in Seoul, South Korea. The team included 110 athletes, 76 men and 34 women. Competitors from Netherlands won 83 medals, including 30 gold, 24 silver and 29 bronze to finish 8th in the medal table.

See also
Netherlands at the Paralympics
Netherlands at the 1988 Summer Olympics

References 

Nations at the 1988 Summer Paralympics
1988
Summer Paralympics